Machhlishahr is a Lok Sabha parliamentary constituency in Uttar Pradesh. Machhlishar Loksabha is combined of Jaunpur And Varanasi districts.

Assembly constituency

Members of Parliament

Election results

See also
 Machhlishahr
 List of Constituencies of the Lok Sabha

External links
Machhlishahr lok sabha  constituency election 2019 result details

References

Lok Sabha constituencies in Uttar Pradesh
Politics of Jaunpur district